Spodnja Voličina (in older sources Spodnja Veličina) is a settlement in the Municipality of Lenart in northeastern Slovenia. It lies in the valley of a minor right tributary of the Pesnica River. The area is part of the traditional region of Styria. It is now included in the Drava Statistical Region.

The parish church in the village is dedicated to Saint Rupert and belongs to the Roman Catholic Archdiocese of Maribor. It dates to the 14th century.

References

External links

Spodnja Voličina on Geopedia

Populated places in the Municipality of Lenart